The Kersin barbel or Berzem ('Luciobarbus kersin'') is a species of cyprinid fish found in freshwater habitats in Iran, Syria and southeastern Turkey.

References 

Barbinae
Cyprinid fish of Asia
Fish described in 1843